Black. White. is an American reality television series that aired on FX. The series premiered on March 8, 2006, and supposedly documented two voluntary families of three, one white, and the other black, in which through studio-quality make-up, the two families would give off a facade appearance, of portraying a race that isn't their own, for social experiment purposes. It garnered controversy for its subject matter and perceived reinforcement of racial stereotypes.

Despite the show giving off the impression all of the families were genuine, only the African-American Sparks family were an actual family. The Caucasian, "Wurgel" family, were not a legitimate family, and they were all actors. JAG actor, Bruno Marcotulli, portrays the father, Bruno "Wurgel". Marcotulli's then girlfriend, Casting Director Carmen Wurgel (who confusingly retained her actual surname for the program, and was also the basis of the illegitimate family surname for the program), portrays the mother, Carmen "Wurgel." Disney Channel actress Rose Bloomfield (most commonly seen in the Disney Channel Movie Surfers segments, where Disney Channel personalities go behind the scenes during film productions) in which she had never met, or knew Marcotulli or Wurgel before production, portrays the daughter, Rose "Wurgel."

The show was produced and created by Ice Cube and R. J. Cutler. The series' theme song was "Race Card", performed by Ice Cube and produced by Warren G. The series ran for five weeks ending with a double episode finale.

Reception
The show received mixed responses. Melanie McFarland of the Seattle Post-Intelligencer stated, "No matter what conclusion you come to after watching FX's six-episode reality series 'Black. White.' you should be grateful for the care producers RJ Cutler and David Maldonado took in executing it."  Matt Roush of TV Guide wrote, "Far from a cheap reality stunt, FX's provocative documentary series Black.White. is an endlessly curious and unexpectedly intelligent social experiment...." Charles Page of the Chicago Tribune said, "Compared to its obvious inspiration, 'Black Like Me,' it is easy to knock 'Black.White.,' the new reality TV experiment on race relations on FX—and many people do....Maybe it is. Or maybe it's a rare injection of substance into TV's usual nonsense."

Criticism
The show also received criticism from major media outlets. Robert Bianco of USA Today wrote:

"The show is being sold on the race-switch trick, but tonight's premiere is built around a far more mundane stunt: putting people you know won't get along into close-quarter situations designed to exacerbate the inevitable conflicts. If you think there's any chance that the two men, Brian and Bruno, weren't cast specifically to clash, or that the producers aren't playing up every conflict, you've never seen a reality show."

"Black. White. is based on two false premises, one more pernicious than the other: that you can understand someone of a different race simply by putting on makeup, and that you need that kind of understanding in order to treat people as the law and morality require."

Lee Siegel of The New Republic commented:

"'Black. White.' is not a provocative study in secret prejudice, followed by growth and awakening. It's a reinforcement of the stereotypes the show claims it wants to examine and expose."

Episodes

International broadcasts
In Canada, Black. White. aired on Sun TV, an independent broadcast television station in Toronto, Ontario, Canada. In Australia, the show was seen on Foxtel & Austar channel Fox8. It was also broadcast in Sweden on a public TV channel. A two-part French version of the show was produced and aired on Canal+ in January 2007, named Dans la peau d'un noir ("In Black Skin").

DVD release

Awards and nominations
The series won an Emmy award for 'Outstanding Makeup for a Series (Non-Prosthetic)' in 2006, and was nominated for an Image Award for 'Outstanding Reality Series' in 2007.

See also
 Blackface
 Black Like Me
 Race Matters

References

External links
 

2000s American reality television series
2006 American television series debuts
2006 American television series endings
FX Networks original programming
African-American reality television series